Major-General Colin George Donald, CB, CBE (18 September 1854 – 31 October 1939) was a British Army officer who became colonel of the Royal Fusiliers.

Military career
Educated at Cheltenham College, Donald was commissioned a lieutenant in the Royal Fusiliers (City of London Regiment) on 21 September 1874. He served in the Second Anglo-Afghan War, was promoted to captain on 30 May 1883 and to major on 3 September 1890. He was promoted to lieutenant-colonel and became commanding officer of the 2nd Battalion Royal Fusiliers on 3 September 1898. The battalion served in the Second Boer War, and was present at the Battle of Colenso in December 1899 and the relief of Ladysmith in February 1900 as well as operations in Western Transvaal. Having completed his period in command of the battalion, he was placed on half-pay with promotion to the brevet rank of colonel on 3 September 1902, and left South Africa on the SS Scot the following day, returning to the United Kingdom later the same month. For his service in the war, Donald was appointed a Companion of the Order of the Bath (CB) in the April 1901 South Africa Honours list (the award was dated to 29 November 1900), and he received the actual decoration after his return, from King Edward VII at Buckingham Palace on 24 October 1902.

After his return he became General Officer Commanding the Hounslow Regimental District from late November 1902. He became General Officer Commanding Home Counties Division in 1908 and General Officer Commanding Wessex Division in 1911. He served in the First World War as Inspector of Territorials in India from 1914 and then as General Officer Commanding Western Reserve Centre from 1915. He also served as colonel of the Royal Fusiliers.

References

|-

|-

1854 births
1939 deaths
British Army major generals
Royal Fusiliers officers
British Army generals of World War I
Companions of the Order of the Bath
Commanders of the Order of the British Empire
People educated at Cheltenham College
British military personnel of the Second Anglo-Afghan War